The National Highway System of Nepal is the group of main roads in Nepal. Any highway or road that connects east to west and north to south is considered a National Highway of Nepal. This system is different from the Feeder Road system and other local road systems of Nepal. However, it contains freeways that cross through the highlands of eastern, central, and western Nepal.

Routes 

On current operations, there are 18 active National Highways throughout the country. Three highways are under construction. Freeways are counted as highways too.

References